Charles Dawson Butler (November 16, 1916May 18, 1988), professionally known as Daws Butler, was an American voice actor. He worked mostly for the Hanna-Barbera animation production company, where he originated the voices of many familiar characters, including Yogi Bear, Huckleberry Hound, Snagglepuss, Auggie Doggie, Loopy De Loop, Wally Gator, Quick Draw McGraw and Baba Looey, Snooper and Blabber, Hokey Wolf, Elroy Jetson, Peter Potamus, The Funky Phantom and Hair Bear.

Early life and career
Butler was born in Toledo, Ohio, the only child of Charles Allen Butler and Ruth Butler. The family later moved from Ohio to Oak Park, Illinois, where Butler became interested in impersonating people.

In 1935, Butler began performing as an impressionist, entering multiple amateur contests and winning most of them—not with the intention of showing his talent, but as a personal challenge to overcome his shyness. He subsequently won professional engagements at vaudeville theaters.

He then teamed up with fellow performers Jack Lavin and Willard Ovitz, forming the comedy trio The Three Short Waves. They played in theaters, on radio, and in nightclubs, with positive reviews from regional critics and audiences. They dissolved the act in 1941 when Butler joined the U.S. Navy as America entered World War II. He subsequently met his wife-to-be Myrtis at a wartime function near Washington, D.C.

His first voice work for an animated character was in the animated short Short Snorts on Sports (1948), produced by Screen Gems. At the Metro-Goldwyn-Mayer cartoon studio, Tex Avery hired Butler to provide the voice of a British wolf on Little Rural Riding Hood (1949) and also to narrate several of his cartoons.

Throughout the late 1940s and mid-1950s, Butler had roles in many Avery-directed cartoons: the Fox in Out-Foxed, the narrator/cat in The Cuckoo Clock, the Cobbler in The Peachy Cobbler, Mr. Theeves and Spike (one line) in Droopy's Double Trouble, Mysto the Magician in Magical Maestro, John the Cab and John the B-29 Bomber in One Cab's Family and Little Johnny Jet, and Charlie in The Legend of Rockabye Point.

Beginning with The Three Little Pups, Butler provided the voice for a nameless wolf that spoke in a Southern accent and whistled all the time (the tune was Henry C. Work's "Kingdom Coming"). The character also appeared in Sheep Wrecked, Billy Boy, and many other cartoons. At MGM, Avery wanted Butler to take on the voice of Droopy, at a time when Bill Thompson was unavailable due to radio engagements. Butler did a few lines, then recommended Don Messick, another actor and Butler's lifelong friend, who was better at imitating Thompson. Messick voiced Droopy in several shorts.

In 1949, Butler landed a role in a televised puppet show created by former Warner Bros. Cartoons animation director Bob Clampett called Time for Beany. He was teamed with Stan Freberg, with whom he did all the puppets' voices: Butler voiced Beany Boy and Captain Huffenpuff, and Freberg voiced Cecil and Dishonest John. An entire stable of recurring characters were also seen. The show's writers were Charles Shows and Lloyd Turner, whose dependably funny dialog was still always at the mercy of Butler's and Freberg's ad libs. Time for Beany ran from 1949 to 1954, and won several Emmy Awards.

In 1952, Butler starred in the live-action short Nice Try, Virgil.

He briefly turned his attention to writing and voicing TV commercials. In the 1950s, Freberg asked him to help him write comedy skits for his Capitol Records albums. Their first collaboration, "St. George and the Dragonet" (based on Dragnet), was the first comedy record to sell over a  million copies. Freberg was more of a satirist who did song parodies, but the bulk of his dialogue routines were co-written by and co-starred Butler.

Butler teamed again with Freberg and actress June Foray in a CBS radio series, The Stan Freberg Show, which ran from July to October 1957 as a summer replacement for Jack Benny's program. Freberg's box set, Tip of the Freberg (Rhino Entertainment, 1999), chronicles every aspect of Freberg's career except the cartoon voice-over work, and showcases his career with Butler. In Mr. Magoo, the UPA theatrical animated short series for Columbia Pictures, Butler played Magoo's nephew Waldo (also voiced by Jerry Hausner at various times). In Freberg's "Green Chri$tma$" in 1958, a scathing indictment of the over-commercialization of the holiday, Butler soberly hoped instead that we'd remember "whose birthday we're celebrating".

Butler provided the voices of many nameless Walter Lantz Productions' characters for theatrical shorts later seen on the Woody Woodpecker program. His characters included the penguin Chilly Willy and his best friend Smedley, a southern-speaking dog (the same voice used for Tex Avery's laid-back wolf character and for Hanna-Barbera's Huckleberry Hound).

In 1957, when MGM had closed their animation unit, producers William Hanna and Joseph Barbera quickly formed their own company, and Butler and Don Messick were on hand to provide voices. The first, The Ruff and Reddy Show, with Butler voicing Reddy, set the formula for the rest of the series of cartoons that the two helmed until the mid-1960s. He played the title roles in The Huckleberry Hound Show, The Quick Draw McGraw Show, and The Yogi Bear Show, and portrayed a variety of other characters.

Characters
Some of the characters voiced by Butler from 1948 to 1978 included:

 Aesop's Son (in the "Aesop and Son" segment of The Rocky and Bullwinkle Show)
 Alfy Gator (of Yakky Doodle)
 Albert (Albert in Blunderland/To Be an Ant)
 Ali Gator (in two Lantz theatrical shorts)
 Augie Doggie
 Baba Looey (from Quick Draw McGraw)
 Barney Rubble (from The Flintstones) (1959–1961; The Flagstones pilot and season two episodes 1, 2, 5, 6, and 9 only)
 Big Gruesome
 Bingo (of The Banana Splits)
 "Bring 'Em Back Alive" Clive
 Brutus the Lion (of The Roman Holidays)
 Cap'n Crunch
 Captain Skyhook (of The Space Kidettes)
 Chilly Willy
 Cogswell
 Colonel Pot Shot
 Dixie Mouse (of Pixie and Dixie)
 Droopy (1955; Deputy Droopy)
 Elroy Jetson
 Fibber Fox (of Yakky Doodle)
 Fred Flintstone (1959; The Flagstones pilot only)
 Gabby Gator (of Woody Woodpecker)
 Gooney the "Gooney Bird" Albatross
 Hair Bear (of Help!... It's the Hair Bear Bunch)
 Henry Orbit
 Hokey Wolf
 Huckleberry Hound
 Hustle (of The CB Bears)
 J. Wellington Wimpy in The All New Popeye Hour
 Jonathan Wellington "Mudsy" Muddlemore (of The Funky Phantom)
 Karlos K. Krinkelbein (from the 1971 animated TV special version of The Cat in the Hat)
 Lambsy (of "It's the Wolf" on Cattanooga Cats)
 Lippy the Lion
 Loopy De Loop
 Louie (from The Dogfather)
 Maxie the Polar Bear
 Mr. Jinks (of Pixie and Dixie and Mr. Jinks)
 Peter Perfect, Red Max, Rock Slag, Rufus Ruffcut, and Sgt. Blast (from Wacky Races) 
 Peter Potamus
 Pug (from The Dogfather; first episode only)
 Quick Draw McGraw
 Quisp
 Raggedy Andy (in The Great Santa Claus Caper (1978) and The Pumpkin Who Couldn't Smile (1979))
 Reddy the dog (from The Ruff & Reddy Show)
 Smedley the Dog (from the Chilly Willy cartoons)
 Snagglepuss
 Snap, Crackle and Pop (of Rice Krispies)
 Super Snooper and Blabber Mouse
 Spike the Bulldog (of Spike and Tyke) (1949–1957)
 Stick and Duke (of Posse Impossible) 
 The Funky Phantom
 The Whether Man, The Senses Taker, The Terrible Trivium, and the Gelatinous Giant from The Phantom Tollbooth
 Undercover Elephant
 Wally Gator
 Wolf (from the Droopy cartoons)
 Yahooey (from Yippee, Yappee and Yahooey)
 Yogi Bear

Butler voiced most of these characters for decades, in both TV shows and in some commercials. The breakfast cereal mascot Cap'n Crunch became an icon of sorts on Saturday morning TV through many commercials produced by Jay Ward. Butler played Cap'n from the 1960s to the 1980s. He based the voice on that of character actor Charles Butterworth. In 1961, while Mel Blanc was recovering from a road accident, Daws Butler substituted for him to voice Barney Rubble in five episodes of The Flintstones (The Hit Songwriter, Droop-Along Flintstone, Fred Flintstone Woos Again, The Rock Quarry Story, The Little White Lie). Butler had previously voiced the characters of Fred Flintstone and Barney Rubble in the 90 second pilot for the series (when it was called The Flagstones).

In 1964, Butler was featured as Huckleberry Hound on a 45rpm record, "Bingo, Ringo", a comedic story combining The Beatles' drummer Ringo Starr and Lorne Greene's hit record "Ringo".

In Wacky Races, Butler provided the voices for a number of the racers, Rock Slag, Big Gruesome, the Red Max, Sgt. Blast, Peter Perfect, and Rufus Ruffcut. He voiced a penguin and a turtle in the movie Mary Poppins, his only known work for Disney. Along with Stan Freberg, Paul Frees and June Foray, Butler also provided voices for children's records featuring recreations of several successful Disney cartoons and films.

Inspirations

Butler based some of his voices on popular celebrities of the day. Yogi Bear began as an Art Carney impression; Butler had done a similar voice in several of Robert McKimson's films at Warner Brothers, and on Stan Freberg's comedy record "The Honey-Earthers". However, he soon changed Yogi's voice, making it much deeper and more sing-songy.

Hokey Wolf began as an impression of Phil Silvers, and Snagglepuss as Bert Lahr. When Snagglepuss began appearing in commercials for Kellogg's Cocoa Krispies in 1961, Lahr threatened to sue Butler for "stealing" his voice. As part of the settlement, the disclaimer "Snagglepuss voice by Daws Butler" was required to appear on each commercial, making him the only voice actor ever to receive credit in an animated TV commercial. Huckleberry Hound was inspired by a North Carolina neighbor of Butler's wife's family; he previously used the voice for Avery's laid-back wolf and Lantz's Smedley.

Later life
In the 1970s, Butler was the voice of "Hair Bear" on Help!... It's the Hair Bear Bunch! and a few characters in minor cartoons such as C.B. Bears. On Laff-a-Lympics, he was virtually the entire "Yogi Yahooey" team. He also played the title character in The Funky Phantom, and Louie and Pug on The Pink Panther Show. In 1977, he guest-starred as Captain Numo and his lackey Schultz on the What's New, Mr. Magoo? episode "Secret Agent Magoo".

Butler remained somewhat low-key in the 1970s and 1980s until a revival of The Jetsons and Hanna-Barbera's crossover series Yogi's Treasure Hunt, both in 1985. Also in 1983, he voiced the title character Wacky WallWalker in Deck the Halls with Wacky Walls.

In 1975, Butler began an acting workshop which spawned such talents as Nancy Cartwright, Corey Burton, Joe Bevilacqua, Bill Farmer, Pat Parris, Tony Pope, Linda Gary, Bob Bergen, Greg Berg, Greg Burson, Mona Marshall, Sherry Lynn, Joey Camen, Keith Scott, Sonny Melendrez, Charles Howerton, Hal Rayle, and writer Earl Kress.

In the year of his death, The Good, the Bad, and Huckleberry Hound was released, featuring most of his early characters.

Personal life
Daws met and married Myrtis Martin in 1943 while he was in the United States Navy during World War II. They had four sons, David, Don, Paul and Charles, and remained married until his death in 1988.

Death
Butler died of a heart attack on May 18, 1988 at Cedars-Sinai Medical Center at age 71. A few months before he died, he contracted pneumonia, and had suffered a stroke a few months before that. The television special Hanna-Barbera's 50th: A Yabba Dabba Doo Celebration was dedicated to him. Many of his roles were assumed by Greg Burson, whom Butler personally trained until his death.

Myrtis Mayfield Martin Butler (born January 13, 1917, Stanly County, North Carolina) died on November 15, 2018 in Beverly Hills, California at the age of 101. She was buried next to Daws in Holy Cross Cemetery, Culver City. Their four sons all survive.

Legacy
Butler trained many voice actors, including Nancy Cartwright (the voice of Bart Simpson), Corey Burton (the voice of Count Dooku in several animated Star Wars series, as well as Dale in Chip 'n' Dale), Bill Farmer (the current voice of Goofy, Pluto, and Horace Horsecollar), Bob Bergen (the voice of Porky Pig), Joe Bevilacqua (whom Butler personally taught how to do all his characters), Greg Burson (the voice of Yogi Bear and Bugs Bunny), and Mona Marshall (the voice of various characters in South Park). Butler's voice and scripts were a frequent part of Bevilacqua's now-defunct XM show.

Bevilacqua also wrote Butler's official biography, published by Bear Manor Media. A new book of cartoon scripts written by Butler and Joe Bevilacqua, Uncle Dunkle and Donnie: Fractured Fables, was scheduled for publication in the fall of 2009. A four-volume, 4½-hour audio set of Uncle Dunkle and Donnie was to be simultaneously released, with Bevilacqua performing all 97 characters in 35 stories. Butler also trained Hal Rayle, who ultimately determined that his best-known character of Doyle Cleverlobe from Galaxy High School should sound like "Elroy Jetson after he finished puberty".

In popular culture
 The video Daws Butler: Voice Magician is a 1987 documentary of Butler's career, from his pre-MGM days through his teaming with Freberg in 1949 and  teaming with Don Messick in 1957. It was originally seen as a PBS pledge-drive special.
 Former Butler protege Joe Bevilacqua hosted a radio series on XM Satellite Radio's Sonic Theater Channel called The Comedy-O-Rama Hour. It had a regular segment, What the Butler Wrote: Scenes from the Daws Butler Workshop, with rare scripts of Butler's performed by his students (including Nancy Cartwright) and rare recordings of Butler himself. Bevilacqua has also co-authored (with Ben Ohmart) the authorized biography book Daws Butler, Characters Actor, and edited the book Scenes for Actors and Voices written by Butler, both published by Bear Manor Media.
 Butler was a contestant on Groucho Marx's quiz show You Bet Your Life in 1960. The studio audience did not recognize him until he began speaking like Huckleberry Hound. He and his partner Marie Gómez split the top prize of $10,000.
 In 1985, Butler was interviewed about his career on Dr. Demento's radio show.

Filmography

Animated films and theatrical shorts

Television

Live-action roles

References

External links

  - NOTE: Domain expired and was purchased by another party (noted 2/1/‘22)
 A rare dramatic role by Butler as Toby Dammit in Poe's story Never Bet the Devil Your Head
 Comedy-O-Rama and Scenes from the Daws Butler Workshop
 A Groucho Marx quiz show episode including Daws Butler
 
 
 

1916 births
1988 deaths
20th-century American comedians
20th-century American male actors
American impressionists (entertainers)
American male radio actors
American male voice actors
Audiobook narrators
Burials at Holy Cross Cemetery, Culver City
Era Records artists
Hanna-Barbera people
Huckleberry Hound
Inkpot Award winners
Male actors from Toledo, Ohio
Metro-Goldwyn-Mayer cartoon studio people
United States Navy personnel of World War II
United States Navy sailors
Walter Lantz Productions people
Warner Bros. Cartoons voice actors
Yogi Bear